R. P. Gustavo Le Paige Archaeological Museum is a museum located in San Pedro de Atacama, Chile. It houses a collection of about 380,000 pre-Columbian artifacts from the Atacameño culture. The museum is named after Jesuit missionary Father Gustavo Le Paige, who was its founder.

This museum belongs to the Catholic University of the North. It closed in September 2015 for refurbishment and redevelopment and reopened in late 2016.

References
Official Museum website 

Museums in Antofagasta Region
Archaeological museums in Chile
Pre-Columbian art museums
University museums in Chile
Anthropology museums
Catholic University of the North